Pat Bradley (born March 24, 1951) is an American professional golfer. She became a member of the LPGA Tour in 1974 and won 31 tour events, including six major championships. She is a member of the World Golf Hall of Fame.

Early life and family
Bradley was born on March 24, 1951, in Westford, Massachusetts, she was the only daughter among six children of Richard and Kay Bradley. Her father was an avid golfer, and her brothers include Mark, a PGA club professional in Jackson Hole, Wyoming, whose son Keegan Bradley won the PGA Championship in 2011. The Bradleys were named "Golf Family of the Year" in 1989 by the National Golf Foundation. As a teenager, she was also an accomplished alpine ski racer.

Amateur career
Bradley won the New Hampshire Amateur in 1967 and 1969 and the New England Amateur in 1972 and 1973. As a member of the golf team of Florida International University in Miami, she was named an All-American in 1970. In early 1973, Bradley tied for twelfth as an amateur at the Burdine's Invitational on the LPGA Tour.

Professional career
Bradley joined the LPGA Tour in 1974 and got her first win at the Girl Talk Classic in 1976 (she also finished second six times that year). Her breakout year was 1978, when she won three times. Her most fertile years came in the early to mid-1980s. She led the LPGA in wins in 1983 (4) and 1986 (5). Her first major came at the 1980 Peter Jackson Classic, followed by the U.S. Women's Open in 1981, and the du Maurier Classic in 1985.

In 1986, Bradley won three of the four LPGA majors - the du Maurier Classic, Nabisco Dinah Shore, and LPGA Championship. She finished fifth in the U.S. Women's Open, three strokes back, to narrowly miss the grand slam. Bradley won the money title and Vare Trophy that year, as well. In 1988, she was diagnosed with Graves' disease, and she played 17 tournaments, but made the cut in only eight. But she returned to form in 1989, winning once. Three more wins followed in 1990.

Bradley won four times in 1991 and captured her second money and scoring titles, and also was named LPGA Tour Player of the Year for a second time. She was also inducted into the World Golf Hall of Fame. A New York Times survey of other LPGA Tour players published July 22, 1992 ranked Bradley as the tour's best long putter and best course manager as well as the best player on tour. The last of her LPGA victories came in 1995.

Sports psychologist Bob Rotella wrote in his 1996 book, Golf Is a Game of Confidence, that Bradley was the most mentally tough athlete he knew. She won a total of 31 tournaments on the LPGA Tour. She was the third woman, behind Mickey Wright and Louise Suggs, to have completed the LPGA "Career Grand Slam". Bradley played on three U.S. Solheim Cup teams (1990, 1992, 1996) and captained the team in 2000. She was inducted into the New Hampshire Golf Hall of Fame in 2018.

Professional wins

LPGA Tour (31)

LPGA Tour playoff record (6–4)

LPGA of Japan Tour (1)
1983 Mazda Japan Classic1
1Co-sanctioned by the LPGA Tour

Legends Tour (1)
2005 BJ's Charity Championship	(with Patty Sheehan; tie with Cindy Rarick and Jan Stephenson)

Other (4)
1975 Colgate Far East Ladies Tournament
1978 JCPenney Mixed Team Classic (with Lon Hinkle)
1989 JCPenney Classic (with Bill Glasson)
1992 JCPenney/LPGA Skins Game

Major championships

Wins (6)

1Won in a sudden-death playoff on the first playoff hole with a birdie.

Results timeline

^ The Women's British Open replaced the du Maurier Classic as an LPGA major in 2001.

CUT = missed the half-way cut.
DQ = disqualified
"T" = tied

Summary

Most consecutive cuts made – 38 (1974 LPGA – 1987 LPGA)
Longest streak of top-10s – 11 (1989 Kraft Nabisco – 1991 U.S. Open)

Team appearances
Professional
Solheim Cup (representing the United States): 1990 (winners), 1992, 1996 (winners), 2000 (non-playing captain)
Handa Cup (representing the United States): 2006 (winners), 2007 (winners), 2008 (winners), 2009 (winners), 2010 (winners), 2011 (winners), 2012 (tie, Cup retained), 2013, 2014 (winners), 2015 (winners)

Solheim Cup record

See also
List of golfers with most LPGA Tour wins
List of golfers with most LPGA major championship wins
Women's career grand slam

References

External links

LPGA Hall of Fame

American female golfers
FIU Panthers women's golfers
LPGA Tour golfers
Winners of LPGA major golf championships
World Golf Hall of Fame inductees
Solheim Cup competitors for the United States
Golfers from Massachusetts
Sportspeople from Barnstable County, Massachusetts
Sportspeople from Middlesex County, Massachusetts
People from Westford, Massachusetts
People from Hyannis, Massachusetts
1951 births
Living people